The Guapore corydoras (Corydoras guapore) is a tropical freshwater fish belonging to the subfamily Corydoradinae of the family Callichthyidae.  It originates in inland waters in South America, and is found in the Guaporé River basin in Brazil.  It is named for the river to which it is native.

The fish grows up to 1.6 in (4.1 cm) long.  It lives in a tropical climate in water with a 6.0–8.0 pH, a water hardness of 2–25 dGH, and a temperature range of 70–75 °F (21–24 °C).  It feeds on worms, benthic crustaceans, insects, and plant matter.  It lays eggs in dense vegetation and adults do not guard the eggs.

The Guapore corydoras is of commercial importance in the aquarium trade industry.

See also
 List of freshwater aquarium fish species

References 

 
Burgess, W.E., 1992. Colored atlas of miniature catfish. Every species of Corydoras, Brochis and Aspidoras. T.F.H. Publications, Inc., USA. 224 p. 

Corydoras
Fish of Brazil
Taxa named by Joachim Knaack
Fish described in 1961